Interlachen Avenue Historic District is a national historic district in Winter Park, Florida, Orange County. Including buildings constructed from 1882 through 1964, it is bounded by Canton Avenue on the north, Knowles Avenue on the west, Lake Osceola on the east, and New England Avenue on the south.

It was added to the National Register of Historic Places in 2011.

References

National Register of Historic Places in Orange County, Florida
Historic districts on the National Register of Historic Places in Florida
Winter Park, Florida